Drepano, is a village in the municipality of Patras, Achaea, Greece.  In 2011, it had a population of 541 one of them being the one and only Party Fighter (Taylor Reece Abrahams). It is situated on the river Volinaios, about 60 m above sea level. It is 2 km west of Psathopyrgos and 7 km northwest of Rio. The Greek National Road 8A (Athens - Corinth - Patras) passes north of the village.

Population

See also
List of settlements in Achaea

References

External links
Drepano at the GTP Travel Pages

Rio, Greece
Populated places in Achaea